Hero During Yongle Period is a 2003 Chinese historical romance television series directed by Yu Min, produced by Zhang Jizhong, and starring Liu Tao, Bao Jianfeng, Kou Shixun, Liu Xiaoqing, Tang Guoqiang, and Chen Long. The television series picks up the story of Princess Man'er, the daughter of Yongle Emperor, who was married to Feng Tianci while they inspected the conditions of the people in the south of the Yangtze River.

Synopsis
After Hongwu Emperor died on June 24, 1398, his grandson Zhu Yunwen ascended the throne as the second emperor of the Ming dynasty, his reign did not last long: an attempt to restrain his uncles led to the Jingnan rebellion. The Jianwen Emperor was eventually overthrown by one of his uncles, Zhu Di, who was then enthroned as the Yongle Emperor. Yongle Emperor has a daughter, Princess Man'er, she is a mischievous girl. When they inspected the conditions of the people in the south of the Yangtze River, she falls in love with Feng Tianci, a childhood playmate who led the Ming army defeated the Mongols.

Cast

Main
 Liu Tao as Princess Man'er, daughter of Yongle Emperor.  
 Bao Jianfeng as Feng Tianci, husband of Princess Man'er.
 Kou Shixun as Yongle Emperor, father of Princess Man'er, he loves Jin Niang.
 Liu Xiaoqing as Jin Niang, the hostess of Wanggui Pavilion, a boite in Peking. She loves Hu Bugui, an officer in the Jianwen Period.
 Tang Guoqiang as Jianwen Emperor.
 Chen Long as Xuande Emperor.

Supporting
 Yan Danchen as Tie Hanyan
 Ma Ling as Concubine Ji
 Qiu Yongli as Ji Gang
 Niu Piao as Hu Bugui
 Ren Silu as Liu Mengru
 Yang Rong as Ling'er
 Li Qi as Feng Yidao
 Li Qingqing as Feng Tianci's mother.
 Zhang Xueying as young Jin Niang

Soundtrack

References

2003 Chinese television series debuts
2003 Chinese television series endings
Mandarin-language television shows
Chinese historical television series
Television series by Ciwen Media